The Organized Crime Control Bureau (OCCB) was one of the ten bureaus that formed the New York Police Department. The Bureau was charged with the investigation and prevention of organized crime within New York City. The OCCB was disbanded in March 2016 with all investigative entities moved to the Chief of Detectives' office. The reason for this, was the NYPD launching a major reshuffle of its investigative forces, consolidating several of them in an effort to tackle the city's biggest crime problem—violence by gangs and youth crews. 

The Organized Crime Control Bureau was headed by Bureau Chief Thomas P. Purtell when it was disbanded.

History
Formed after the Knapp Commission investigations into police corruption, all investigations within the bureau were conducted by specially structured teams, in an effort to reduce the chance of corruption.

Following the 2008 Mumbai attacks, officers from the OCCB were trained in the use of Ruger Mini-14s to provide support to the Emergency Service Unit forming the Critical Incident Response Capacity (CIRC) in case of a similar situation arising in New York City.

Organization
 Narcotics Division
 Narcotics Boroughs Manhattan North and Manhattan South
 Narcotics Boroughs Brooklyn North and Brooklyn South
 Narcotics Borough Bronx
 Narcotics Borough Queens
 Narcotics Borough Staten Island
 Vice Enforcement Division (Merged with Narcotics Division in 2011)
 Auto Crime Division
 Gang Division
 Manhattan Gang Squad
 Brooklyn North and Brooklyn South Gang Squads
 Bronx Gang Squad
 Queens Gang Squad
 Staten Island Gang Squad
 Firearms Suppression Division
 Investigative Support Division
 Organized Crime Investigation Division
 Field Control Division (Internal Affairs)

Overview
The Organized Crime Control Bureau had numerous units and sub-units that investigate matters such as organized auto larceny rings, unlawful firearms, and prostitution. It was involved in using the Racketeer Influenced and Corrupt Organizations Act (RICO) to search and destroy organized criminal activities and seize property and vehicles. The OCCB utilized undercover police officers to infiltrate various criminal organizations and had been effective against the Italian Mafia, "the Westies" of the Irish Mob, Chinese Triads, and Russian Bratvas organized criminal elements. The OCCB's Joint Organized Crime Task Force worked in cooperation with the Federal Bureau of Investigation's New York Field Division (the largest FBI office in the US).

See also 

 New York City Police Department
 Federal Bureau of Investigation
 Law & Order: Organized Crime—Features a fictional version of the NYPD's Organized Crime Control Bureau

References 

1971 establishments in New York City
2016 disestablishments in New York (state)
Organizad Crime Control Bureau
Organized crime in New York City